Enrique Dupuy de Lôme (August 23, 1851 – July 1, 1904) was a Spanish ambassador to the United States.  In the De Lôme Letter, he mocked U.S. President William McKinley, attacked McKinley's policies, and regarded McKinley as a weak president. Cuban rebels intercepted the letter, and on February 9, 1898, the letter was published in US newspapers. That contributed to the Spanish–American War, which started on April 25, 1898.

Dupuy de Lôme was appointed Minister from Spain to the United States for the second time in May 1885. He was also Commissioner to the Columbian Exposition. His wife and the Duchess of Veragua represented the Queen Regent of Spain at this exposition. Dupuy de Lôme had large diplomatic experience, having represented his country in London, Paris, Berlin and Brussels. At all the legations, he was accompanied by his wife.

She was Vidiella of Cadiz and was married when she was seventeen years of age. Most of her life since was spent in foreign legations. Besides her native tongue she spoke three other languages and was a good English scholar. Their two sons at the ages of nine and eleven, spoke four languages.

References

Mario G. Losano, Viaggiatori spagnoli nel Giappone occidentalizzato. Spanish travelers in Japan westernized, "Revista de Historiografía" (Madrid), 2012, n. 2, pp. 150–168.

External links
 

Ambassadors of Spain to the United States
1851 births
1904 deaths